Bereavement may refer to:

Grief, a response to loss
Bereavement (film), a 2010 American thriller
Shidu (bereavement), a Chinese social phenomenon in the aftermath of the one-child policy